Lucilla Boari (born 24 March 1997) is an Italian recurve archer who has represented Italy at the 2016 Summer Olympics and at the 2020 Summer Olympics. She has additionally competed for her country at the 2018 Mediterranean Games and the 2019 European Games, in which she won an individual gold and silver medal respectively.

Career

2016 Summer Olympics
Boari secured two qualification spots for her country in the final world qualification tournament for the 2016 Summer Olympics, delivering the shot that claimed victory over Chinese Taipei to give Italy a full Olympic berth of three archers. Boari was subsequently chosen as part of the Italian squad alongside fellow Olympic debutants Claudia Mandia and Guendalina Sartori in July 2016.

At the Olympic Games the following month, Boari competed in the women's individual and women's team events. With teammates Mandia and Sartori, Boari successfully progressed to the semi-finals in the women's team competition, defeating the Brazilian and Chinese teams before losing to Russia. In the bronze medal match their opponents Chinese Taipei were too strong, and the Italian trio finished the competition in fourth place. Boari was however much less successful in the individual tournament, and after placing seventh in the ranking round lost to Australia's Alice Ingley in the opening elimination round.

2018–2019: Post-Olympics
In June 2018, Boari won gold medal in the women's individual event at the Mediterrean Games, defeating the Spain's Mónica Galisteo Cruz in the final. The following year she competed in the European Games, where in the women's individual event she achieved the sixth seed in the 72-arrow ranking round before advancing through the elimination rounds to the gold medal final. She was defeated in the final by compatriot Tatiana Andreoli, earning the silver medal as runner-up.

2020 Summer Olympics
In 2021, she won the bronze medal at the 2020 Summer Olympics in the women's individual event. At the same time she came out as lesbian, revealing that Dutch archer Sanne de Laat is her girlfriend.

References

External links
 

Italian female archers
Living people
1997 births
Archers at the 2016 Summer Olympics
Olympic archers of Italy
Mediterranean Games gold medalists for Italy
Mediterranean Games silver medalists for Italy
Mediterranean Games medalists in archery
Competitors at the 2018 Mediterranean Games
Competitors at the 2022 Mediterranean Games
Archers at the 2019 European Games
European Games medalists in archery
European Games silver medalists for Italy
Archers at the 2020 Summer Olympics
Medalists at the 2020 Summer Olympics
Olympic medalists in archery
Olympic bronze medalists for Italy
Italian LGBT sportspeople
21st-century Italian women